Pont de Sassanat  is a small bridge located in Escaldes-Engordany Parish, Andorra. It is a heritage property registered in the Cultural Heritage of Andorra built in 1942–44.

References

Escaldes-Engordany
Bridges in Andorra
Cultural Heritage of Andorra
Bridges completed in 1944